Whispers and Promises is an instrumental-pop studio album by Earl Klugh released in 1989. The album received a Grammy nomination for Best Pop Instrumental Performance at the 32nd Grammy Awards in 1990. In this release, Klugh delivers his well-known "light and smooth guitar picking, backed by swarms of violins, chimes and gentle alto saxophones, beautifully arranged and wonderfully romantic". The album also features Grammy Award winner Don Sebesky as conductor and arranger.

Track listing 
All songs written by Earl Klugh.
"What Love Can Do" - 4:30
"Master of Suspense" - 4:56
"Water Song" - 2:28
"Strawberry Avenue" - 4:22
"Fall in Love" - 4:25
"Summer Nights" - 4:08
"Just You and Me" - 3:41
"Whispers and Promises" - 5:32
"Frisky Biscuits" - 3:34
"Tango Classico" - 5:14

Track information and credits verified from the album's liner notes.

Charts

References 

1989 albums
Earl Klugh albums
Albums arranged by Don Sebesky
Warner Records albums